The 2011 World Ladies Snooker Championship was the 2011 edition of the World Women's Snooker Championship, first held in 1976, and was played at the Pot Black Sports Bar, Bury St Edmonds, from 8 to 13 April. The tournament was won by Reanne Evans, who achieved her seventh consecutive world title by defeating Emma Bonney 5–1 in the final. It was Evans' 88th consecutive match win in women's snooker events. Evans received £1,000 prize money for her win. Bonney made the highest  of the tournament, 67.

There were four round-robin qualifying groups, each of five players, with the top two players in each group progressing into the knockout stage to play one of the top eight seeds. Hannah Jones, aged 14, won the under-21 title for the fourth consecutive year in an event run alongside the main tournament.

Main Draw

References 

2011 in English sport
2011 in snooker
2011 in women's sport
International sports competitions hosted by England
2011
April 2011 sports events in the United Kingdom